William Blair Bruce (8October 185917November 1906) was a Canadian painter. He studied in France and became one of Canada's first impressionist painters. He lived most of his life in France and on the island of Gotland, Sweden, where he and his Swedish wife Carolina Benedicks-Bruce created the artists estate Brucebo, which was later established as a nature reserve.

Biography

Early years 
William Blair Bruce was born on 8October 1859, in Hamilton, Ontario, Canada, where he grew up in Corktown and on the Mountain. A plaque in Bruce Park, Hamilton marks the site of his childhood home. He was the son of William Bruce, born 1833 in Scotland, who emigrated to Hamilton with his wife Janet Blair  in 1837. Initially Bruce studied law at Hamilton Collegiate Institute, but had his mind set on becoming an architect, and studied for a while at the Mechanics Institute in Hamilton, in 1877. He worked for an architectural firm for the ensuing two years. Members of his family were both musically and artistically inclined and noticed Bruce's talent at an early age. In 1881, they sent him to Paris to study, a journey that extended over the years. He would only return to Canada on two short occasions.

Paris 

In Paris his classical education at Académie Julian included genre scenes and several other subjects. Like other artists of the time he wanted to experience the Parisian art scene and join in the competition to exhibit at the annual Salon in Paris. He also traveled to the artist colony in Barbizon where he and a group of artist friends rented a cottage in 1882, and Grez-sur-Loing where a new generation of Swedish artists, such as Carl Larsson, his wife Karin Bergöö, Bruno Liljefors and August Strindberg had formed a colony. He became acquainted with Impressionism and en plein air or "outdoors painting", a style he came to prefer working with. He also became one of Canada's first impressionist painters. Bruce exhibited at the Salon in 1882. His works received positive reviews but the following year his self confidence and finances deteriorated. His parents were not entirely enthusiastic about his new painting style but he ignored them and began to create very large paintings. His Temps Passé was exhibited at the 1884 Salon although despite this success he remained in financial difficulties. Bruce subsequently suffered a nervous breakdown and hastily returned to Canada for the first time. To compound his problems, the steamship Brooklyn, carrying about 200 of his works, sank outside Anticosti Island in the Gulf of Saint Lawrence on 8November 1885.

In the summer of 1885, Bruce had met the Swedish sculptor Carolina Benedicks in France. They fell in love and when Bruce returned to Canada, she made a surprise visit accompanied by her brother Gustaf, to persuade him to return to Paris. They were engaged in the autumn of 1886, and returned to Europe in 1887.

Return to Europe 

Bruce returned to France a bolder artist. In 1887, he and a group of fellow artists such as the American painter Theodore Robinson, travelled to Giverny where they shared a house and, influenced by Monet who lived nearby, painted a number of impressive impressionist sketches. In 1888, on his return to Paris, he painted The Phantom Hunter, which became an instant success at the Salon and marked the peak of his career. He and Benedicks married at the British embassy in Stockholm on 4December the same year. She provided energy and stability for Bruce throughout his life and also became his favorite model.

In May 1889, the couple returned to Grez and Bruce wrote to his mother that "Grèz  is a great improvement on Barbizon, quite a different country in fact". A month later, Bruce also sold some paintings to the American artist Walter Gay, who was visiting Grez at the time. Bruce and Benedicks-Bruce continued to make annual visits to Grez up until 1894. They rented a small house, which had previously been the home of Carl Larsson and his wife Karin. It was here that Bruce painted his Open Air Studio (now in the National Museum of Fine Arts, Stockholm). It is a view from their home in Grez, in which he pictured Benedicks-Bruce doing an etching out-doors behind a sun screen. In 1895, the couple made a brief journey to Hamilton in Canada, where Bruce painted on the Six Nations Reserve. Throughout the 1890s, they led a bohemian life, travelling to Capri, Italy and Sweden where they took a liking to Gotland and its light.

In 1900–06, the couple created a summer home called Brucebo (Swedish for: "The house where Bruce lives") on Gotland. Here, Bruce painted, did some amateur archaeology and socialized with the locals, while Benedicks-Bruce worked with sculptures and etchings as well as tending the garden and the many animals she had gathered at Brucebo.

Bruce died suddenly on 17November 1906 in Stockholm at the age of 47, and Benedicks-Bruce settled down permanently at Brucebo. After Bruce's death, a commemorative exhibition of 122 of his works was held in Paris in 1907. Carolina donated 29 of his paintings to the City of Hamilton. This donation became the foundation of the Art Gallery of Hamilton that opened in 1914. Even though Bruce enjoyed a good reputation towards the end of his life with 15 participations at the Salon, exhibitions in London, Toronto, Stockholm, Buffalo and came to influence many young artists in Canada, he remains  relatively unknown. A large part of his production can be seen at Brucebo, which is now a museum managed by the Brucebo Foundation.

Benedicks-Bruce lived at Brucebo until her death on 16February 1935.

Brucebo 

Originally used as a summer house by Bruce and his wife, they rebuilt and extended Brucebo in 1900–06 into their permanent home and studio. In 2009, the estate was converted into an art museum. In connection with this, a shooting occurred at the main house. The museum and the estate are managed by the Brucebo Foundation. The foundation also grants scholarship to younger Canadian artists. In 1970, the  Brucebo estate was established as a nature reserve.

Gallery

References

Further reading 

A summary of Bruce`s life and work is available in the essay "The Big Picture" by Tobi Bruce, in:

External links 

Maps, pictures and a presentation of Brucebo (in Swedish)

1859 births
1906 deaths
19th-century Canadian painters
Canadian male painters
Artists from Hamilton, Ontario
Canadian Impressionist painters
Canadian expatriates in France
Canadian expatriates in Sweden
19th-century Canadian male artists